Jean Payette (born March 29, 1946) is a Canadian retired professional ice hockey forward. He played 112 games in the World Hockey Association with the Quebec Nordiques.

External links
 

1946 births
Canadian ice hockey centres
Ice hockey people from Ontario
Living people
Sportspeople from Cornwall, Ontario
Quebec Nordiques (WHA) players